Macrotritopus is a poorly known genus of octopuses in the family Octopodidae. As it stands, Macrotritopus contains one valid described species, Macrotritopus defilippi. Two poorly described, unresolved taxa which are known only from planktonic hatchlings have been tentively assigned Macrotritopus equivocus and M. scorpio, as well as a further three undescribed Indo-Pacific species. Macrotritopus was originally described from a single juvenile specimen  which was named Macrotritopus equivocus notable for having an elongated third arm. This specimen gave the name Macrotritopus larva to this form of paralarva which was misidentified as the newly hatched juveniles of Scaeurgus unicirrhus. When the eggs of M. defilippi, which were kept in captivity, hatched and the resultant larvae were observed to be of the Macrotritopus larval type then the juveniles were connected with the adults. This means that the type species of Macrotritopus is a juvenile and that M. defillipi is the only species where the adult form is known. The presence of Macrotritopus larvae” off South Africa and the Indo‑West Pacific from  Australia to Hawaii indicates that there may be a number of yet to be described species within this genus.

Species
Macrotritopus defilippi (Vérany, 1851)
Macrotritopus equivocus (Robson, 1929) (taxon inquirendum, juvenile: identity unresolved)
Macrotritopus scorpio (Berry, 1920) (taxon inquirendum, unresolved, potential name for West Atlantic "defillipi")

References

Octopuses
Cephalopod genera
Taxa named by Georg Grimpe